is a city and port in Iburi Subprefecture, Hokkaido, Japan. It is the largest city in the Iburi Subprefecture, and the fourth largest city in Hokkaido. As of 29 February 2012, it had an estimated population of 174,216, with 83,836 households, and a population density of 310.27 persons per km2 (803.60 persons per sq. mi.).

History
The name of Tomakomai is derived from Ainu words "to" and "makomai", meaning "Marsh" and "River which goes into the depths of the mountain", respectively.
1879: Yūfutsu branch of Hokkaidō Development Commission was transferred into Tomakomai (Foundation anniversary).
1902: Tomakomai became second class village.
1918: Tomakomai village became Tomakomai town.
1948: Tomakomai town became Tomakomai city.
1963: Tomakomai Port (West) was opened.
1980: Tomakomai Port (East) was opened.
6 September 2018: Tomakomai City is the nearest city from the epicenter of the 2018 Hokkaido Eastern Iburi earthquake.

Geography
Mount Tarumae is located in the northwest of Tomakomai and belongs to Shikotsu-Tōya National Park.

Climate
Tomakomai has a humid continental climate typical of Hokkaido.

Transportation

Airport
 New Chitose Airport

Rail
 Muroran Main Line: Nishikioka - Itoi - Aoba - Tomakomai - Numanohata
 Chitose Line: Numanohata - Uenae
 Hidaka Main Line: Numanohata - Yūfutsu

Road
 Hokkaidō Expressway
 Hidaka Expressway

Seaport
 Tomakomai West Port Ferry Terminal: connected with regular ferry services by MOL Ferry, Taiheiyō Ferry, K Line Kinkai.

Education

University
 Hokuyou University

College
 National Institute of Technology, Tomakomai College

High schools

Public
 Hokkaido Tomakomai Higashi High School
 Hokkaido Tomakomai Minami High School
 Hokkaido Tomakomai Nishi High School
 Hokkaido Tomakomai Technical High School
 Hokkaido Tomakomai Sogokeizai High School

Private
 Tomakomai Chuo High School
 Komazawa University Tomakomai High School

Sports
In 2014, Tomakomai hosted the World Broomball Championships.

Sister cities and friendship city

Sister cities
  Hachioji, Tokyo, Japan (since 1973)
  Napier, Hawke's Bay Region, New Zealand (since 1980)
  Nikko, Tochigi, Japan (since 1982)

Friendship city
  Qinhuangdao, Hebei, China (since 1998)

Notable people from Tomakomai

Tsutomu Kawabuchi, ice hockey player and coach, member of the IIHF Hall of Fame
Asami Kimura, singer in Hello! Project and former Country Musume member and leader
Eiichi Kudo, film director
Junko Misaki, enka singer
Kei Sanbe, manga artist
Naoki Sano, professional wrestler
Takuya Onodera, professional wrestler best known as T-Hawk
Hisayoshi Sato, swimmer
Yushiro Hirano, ice hockey player, Abbotsford Canucks

References

External links

Official Website  

 
Cities in Hokkaido
Port settlements in Japan
Populated coastal places in Japan